Rasputin the Mad Monk is a 1966 Hammer horror film directed by Don Sharp and starring Christopher Lee as Grigori Rasputin, the Russian peasant-mystic who gained great influence with the Tsars prior to the Russian Revolution. It also features Barbara Shelley, Francis Matthews, Suzan Farmer, Richard Pasco, Dinsdale Landen and Renée Asherson. The story is largely fictionalized, although some of the events leading up to Rasputin's assassination are very loosely based on Prince Yusupov's account of the story. For legal reasons (Yusupov was still alive when the film was released), the character of Yusupov was replaced by Ivan (Matthews).

The emphasis is on Rasputin's terrifying powers both to work magic and to seduce women.

Plot
In the Russian countryside, Rasputin heals the sick wife of an innkeeper (Derek Francis). When he is later hauled before an Orthodox bishop for his sexual immorality and violence, the innkeeper springs to the monk's defence. Rasputin protests that he is sexually immoral because he likes to give God "sins worth forgiving" (loosely based on Rasputin's rumored connection to Khlysty, an obscure Christian sect which believed that those deliberately committing fornication, then repenting bitterly, would be closer to God). He also claims to have healing powers in his hands, and is unperturbed by the bishop's accusation that his power comes from Satan.

Rasputin heads for Saint Petersburg, where he forces his way into the home of Dr Zargo (Pasco), from where he begins his campaign to gain influence over the Tsarina (Asherson). He manipulates one of the Tsarina's ladies-in-waiting, Sonia (Shelley), whom he uses to satisfy his voracious sexual appetite and gain access to the Tsarina. He places her in a trance and commands her to cause an apparent accident that will injure the czar's young heir Alexei, so that Rasputin can be called to court to heal him. After this success, he hypnotizes the Tsarina to replace her existing doctor with Zargo (who has previously been struck off after a scandal).

However, Rasputin's ruthless pursuit of wealth and prestige, and increasing control over the royal household, attracts opposition. When Rasputin rejects Sonia saying that she has served her purpose, she tries to kill him. Rasputin places Sonia in a trance telling her to destroy herself. Sonia's brother, Peter (Landen), finds Sonia dead from cutting her wrists and is so enraged by Rasputin's seduction and killing of his sister, he enlists the help of Ivan to bring about the monk's downfall. Peter, in challenging the monk, is horribly scarred by acid thrown in his face, and suffers a lingering death.

Tricking Rasputin into thinking his sister Vanessa (Farmer) is interested in him, Ivan arranges a supposed meeting. However, Zargo has poisoned the wine and chocolates, which the Monk starts to consume. Soon Rasputin collapses, but the poison is not enough to kill him. In the ensuing struggle between the three men, Zargo is stabbed by Rasputin and quickly dies. Ivan manages to throw Rasputin out of the window to his death.

Cast
 Christopher Lee as Grigori Rasputin
 Barbara Shelley as Sonia
 Richard Pasco as Dr Boris Zargo
 Francis Matthews as Ivan
 Suzan Farmer as Vanessa
 Dinsdale Landen as Peter
 Renée Asherson as the Tsarina
 Derek Francis as Innkeeper
 John Welsh as The Abbot
 Joss Ackland as The Bishop
 Robert Duncan as the Tsarevich
 Alan Tilvern as Patron
 Bryan Marshall as Vassily
 Brian Wilde as Vassily's Father

Production
Rasputin the Mad Monk was filmed back-to-back in 1965 with Dracula: Prince of Darkness, using the same sets at Hammer's Bray Studios. Lee, Matthews, Shelley and Farmer appeared in both films. In some markets, it was released on a double feature with The Reptile.

It was the third collaboration between Christopher Lee and Don Sharp, following The Devil Ship Pirates and The Face of Fu Manchu.

Lee later said, "The only way you can present him is the way he was historically described. He was a lecher and a  drunk, and definitely had healing powers. So he was a saint and a sinner... There were very few good sides to him. Rasputin is one of the best things I’ve done. "

"I think it's the best thing Chris Lee's ever done," said Sharp in 1992. "Rasputin was supposed to have had this ability to hypnotise people, well Chris practically developed that ability."

Filming started 8 June. Don Sharp says the budget was cut during filming, causing the loss of several key scenes. He also claims Yusopov's lawyers threatened Hammer shortly before filming was to commence, necessitating last minute rewriting of the script. Filming occurred at Bray Studios in Berkshire.

A scene of Sonia's suicide was filmed but not shown.

The original ending had the lifeless Rasputin lying on the ice with his hands held up to his forehead in benediction. However, it was considered controversial for religious reasons, and was removed. Stills of the original ending still exist.

Sharp says the final fight scene between Francis Matthews and Christopher Lee was greatly cut by Tony Keys when Sharp had to leave the film during editing. Sharp had greatly enjoyed the experience of making his first two Hammer films - Kiss of the Vampire and Devil Ship Pirates - but not Rasputin. However he did feel the film was "one of the best things Chris Lee's ever done".

As a child in the 1920s, Lee had actually met Rasputin's killer, Felix Yusupov. In later life Lee met Rasputin's daughter Maria.

A novelization of the film was written by John Burke as part of his 1967 book The Second Hammer Horror Film Omnibus.

Reception

According to Fox records, the film and The Reptile needed to earn $1,200,000 in rentals to break even and made $1,645,000, meaning it made a profit.

Notes

References

External links

 
 
 
 Rasputin the Mad Monk at Letterbox DVD
 Rasputin the Mad Monk at BFI

1966 films
1960s historical horror films
British biographical films
British historical horror films
CinemaScope films
Films directed by Don Sharp
Films set in Russia
Films set in the 1900s
Films set in the 1910s
Films shot at Bray Studios
1960s exploitation films
Hammer Film Productions horror films
Films about Grigori Rasputin
1960s biographical films
1960s English-language films
1960s British films